Carolyn Green Logan (born July 5, 1957) is a Democratic member of the North Carolina House of Representatives. She has represented the 101st district (including constituents Mecklenburg County) since 2019.

Career
Logan won the November 2018 general election. She secured seventy-nine percent of the vote while her closest rival, Republican Paul Mauney, secured twenty-one percent. She was re-elected in 2020.

Committee assignments

2021-2022 session
Appropriations
Appropriations - General Government
Federal Relations and American Indian Affairs
Homeland Security, Military, and Veterans Affairs
State Personnel

2019-2020 session
Appropriations
Appropriations - General Government
Homeland Security, Military, and Veterans Affairs
State and Local Government

Electoral history

2020

2018

References

Living people
1957 births
People from Charlotte, North Carolina
Democratic Party members of the North Carolina House of Representatives
African-American women in politics
20th-century African-American people
21st-century American politicians
21st-century American women politicians
21st-century African-American politicians
African-American state legislators in North Carolina
Women state legislators in North Carolina